Blythswood is a former Presbyterian mission station near Butterworth. Named after Captain Matthew T Blyth, first Chief Magistrate of the Transkei. It is an important education centre.

The Nqamakwe rock art site, showcasing some example of Khoisan rock art, is relatively close to the settlement.

References

Populated places in the Mnquma Local Municipality